Moxham Historic District is a national historic district located at Johnstown in Cambria County, Pennsylvania. The district includes 330 contributing buildings in a predominantly residential area in southern Johnstown.  There are 315 contributing dwellings, 17 former carriage house / horse barns, 21 commercial buildings, 10 churches, and one former school.  The district includes five contributing buildings dated before the Johnstown Flood, but the majority date from 1890 to 1930.  The dwellings include notable examples of popular architectural styles including Bungalow/craftsman, Colonial Revival, and American Foursquare.  Notable non-residential buildings include St. Patrick's Catholic Church (1905), former Calvary Methodist Church (1894), Allegheny Wesleyan Methodist Church (1898), Grove Avenue Methodist Church (1902), Second Presbyterian Church (1914), and former Cypress Avenue School (1900).

The Moxham district is typical of the nineteenth century western Pennsylvania industrial communities, in this instance growing around the Johnston Steel Street Rail Company.  The district was designed for a variety of social levels, whereas most nearby neighborhoods such as Cambria City, Minersville, and Old Conemaugh were strictly for blue-collar workers.  Moxham was built in a relatively flood-free area, though apparently more by luck than by planning, and experienced much of its growth after the 1889 Johnstown Flood.

Moxham was listed on the National Register of Historic Places in 1999.

References 

Historic districts on the National Register of Historic Places in Pennsylvania
Colonial Revival architecture in Pennsylvania
Historic districts in Cambria County, Pennsylvania
National Register of Historic Places in Cambria County, Pennsylvania
Bungalow architecture in Pennsylvania
American Craftsman architecture in Pennsylvania
American Foursquare architecture